Szilvia Tarjányi (born 11 January 1992 in Csongrád) is a Hungarian handballer. She has been capped for the Hungarian junior national team.

Achievements
Nemzeti Bajnokság I:
Winner: 2010
Magyar Kupa:
Silver Medalist: 2012
EHF Champions League:
Semifinalist: 2010

References

External links
 Career statistics at Worldhandball

1992 births
Living people
People from Csongrád
Hungarian female handball players
Győri Audi ETO KC players
Békéscsabai Előre NKSE players
Sportspeople from Csongrád-Csanád County